No Kids is a 2015 Argentine comedy film directed by Ariel Winograd.

Cast 
 Diego Peretti - Gabriel
 Maribel Verdú - Vicky
 Guadalupe Manent - Sofía
 Horacio Fontova
 Martín Piroyansky 
 Marina Bellati
 Pablo Rago

References

External links 

2015 comedy films
Films shot in Buenos Aires
Films set in Buenos Aires
Argentine comedy films
2010s Argentine films